Cab No. 13 ( (Austria),  (Germany);)  is a 1926 drama film directed by Michael Curtiz and starring Lili Damita, Jack Trevor and Walter Rilla.

The film's sets were designed by the art director Paul Leni. Location shooting took place in Paris.

Story 
Set in 1910, a young mother leaves her newborn baby in a carriage. The coachman takes care of the baby and names her Lilian. The child becomes a graceful dancer and falls in love with her neighbor, a young musician. Before they marry, Lilian finds her father who is a rich importer. She now has two fathers who care about her happiness.

Cast

See also
 Cab Number 13 (1948)

References

External links

Cab No. 13 on Silent Hollywood
Fiaker Nr. 13 at Movie Meter (Dutch)
Fiaker Nr. 13 (1926 D) at Cinema Context

1926 films
Films of the Weimar Republic
Films directed by Michael Curtiz
1926 drama films
Austrian black-and-white films
German black-and-white films
Austrian silent feature films
German silent feature films
Films based on French novels
German drama films
Austrian drama films
Sascha-Film films
Phoebus Film films
Films set in Paris
Silent drama films
1920s German films